Olson Park and Waterfall was a heavily visited park and waterfall complex that was located in the Avondale community area of Chicago. It was built by Walter E. Olson, the owner of the Olson Rug Company, next to his factory and headquarters on the northwest corner of Diversey and Pulaski, and was a popular landmark for Chicago families. Built during the Great Depression the park was open to the public until it was closed in 1971 after Marshall Field bought the complex in 1965. The Chicago Tribune named Olson Park as the first of "Chicago's Seven Lost Wonders". The park's opening was famous for the fact that during its opening, the park was symbolically "deeded" back to Native Americans, observing the hundred year anniversary of the expulsion of Indians across the Mississippi River after the Blackhawk War. Today the site is occupied by a parking lot for the former Olson Rug factory and headquarters which is now occupied by the retailer Macy's.

The area is near of one of Chicago's "Polish Patches", Jackowo, and the complex was a few blocks from St. Hyacinth Basilica as well as Kosciuszko Park.

References

External links
Olson Memorial Park, Waterfall and Rock Garden in Digital Research Library of Illinois History Journal™
Olson Waterfall in Forgotten Chicago
Web page featuring the Olson Waterfall in Forgotten Chicago
Article on Chicago's Seven Lost Wonders from August 2005, Chicago Tribune

Former buildings and structures in Chicago
Demolished buildings and structures in Chicago